Psathyrella piluliformis is a species of agaric fungus in the family Psathyrellaceae. The caps are chestnut to reddish brown, the color fading in age and with dry weather. The closely spaced gills have an adnate attachment to the stipe. They are initially tan until the spores mature, when the gills turn dark brown. Fragments of the partial veil may remain on the cap margin, and as a wispy band of hairs on the stipe. The stipe is 2–7 cm tall and 3–7 mm wide, white, smooth, hollow, and bulging at the base. Fruiting occurs in clusters at the base of hardwood stumps.

It is considered edible but of low quality, with fragile flesh and being difficult to identify. Similar species include Psathyrella carbonicola, P. longipes, P. longistriata, P. multipedata, P. spadicea, and Parasola conopilus.

See also
List of Psathyrella species

References

External links

Fungi described in 1783
Fungi of Europe
Fungi of North America
Psathyrellaceae
Edible fungi